The 2018 elections for the Pennsylvania State Senate were held on November 6, 2018, with 25 of 50 districts being contested. Primary elections were held on May 15, 2018. The term of office for those elected in 2018 began when the Senate convened in January 2019. Pennsylvania State Senators are elected for four-year terms, with half of the seats up for election every two years.

Overview
Republicans have controlled the chamber for  years (since the 1994 election). Democrats won five seats but failed to retake the majority despite winning the popular vote by over 200,000 votes. However, in five contests a Democrat ran unopposed with no Republicans appearing on the ballot. Republican senator Randy Vulakovich of the 38th district was the only incumbent to be defeated in the primary elections, losing to Jeremy Shaffer, who in turn lost to Democratic candidate Lindsey Williams in the general election. Two other Republican incumbents – Thomas J. McGarrigle and  John Rafferty Jr. – were also defeated in the general election by their Democratic challengers (Timothy P. Kearney and Katie Muth, respectively). In the 10th district, Republican Chuck McIlhinney chose to retire, and his seat was won by Democrat Steve Santarsiero, while in the 12th district, Republican Stewart Greenleaf retired and was replaced by Democrat Maria Collett.

Close races
Ten district races had winning margins of less than 15%:

Controversy
Democrat Lindsey Williams defeated Republican Jeremy Shaffer in the 38th District, a seat previously held by Republican Randy Vulakovich. After the election, Senate Republicans questioned whether Williams met the State-Constitutional requirement to be a "citizen and inhabitant" of Pennsylvania for four years prior to the election, as she claimed to have moved to Pennsylvania exactly four years prior to her election. After weeks of speculation and rumors of the GOP majority planning to refuse to seat her, Senate Majority Leader Joe Scarnati announced that he would recommend that she be seated. This announcement came after Williams provided proof that she had accepted a job in Pennsylvania on November 2, 2014. Ultimately, Williams was sworn in with the rest of the senators without any objection.

Results

Source: Pennsylvania Department of State

References 

2018 Pennsylvania elections
Pennsylvania State Senate elections
Pennsylvania Senate